The Medrese Mosque is an Ottoman mosque in the northern Greek city of Veria.

The mosque occupies the site of the Byzantine church of St. Paul, on the southern part of the city, outside the city wall. After they conquered the city in 1430, the Ottomans converted the church into the Mosque of Musa Çelebi. This was later torn down for unknown reasons, and its building material reused in the construction of the present structure. The mosque derives its name from the nearby medrese, which burned down sometime in the 1920s. During the Ottoman period, this was the largest mosque of the city, and was noted for the particular beauty of the surrounding space. The 17th-century traveller Evliya Çelebi also reports that a Muslim graveyard existed nearby.

The mosque remains the best-preserved of the city's remaining mosques. It is a simple square structure, with a dome of  diameter, supported by a dodecagonal drum. In the interior, however, the drum is not visible, and the dome seems to rest directly on the walls of the main hall. The dome was sheathed in bronze, and its interior was decorated with floral motifs typical of Islamic art and Quranic verses. The mihrab also survives, although damaged, retaining traces of its richly coloured decoration. The building also boasts the only minaret to survive unscathed; on its foundation, a marble fragment taken from the ancient temple to Eunomia is visible.

References

Sources 
 

Ottoman mosques in Greece
Buildings and structures in Veria
Former mosques in Greece